Iona is a city in Murray County, Minnesota, United States. The population was 137 at the 2010 census.

Geography

Main routes include Minnesota State Highway 267, Parnell Street, Grace Avenue, and Murray County Road 4.  County Road 31 is nearby.

Demographics

2010 census
As of the census of 2010, there were 137 people, 71 households, and 36 families residing in the city. The racial makeup of the city was 100.0% White.

There were 71 households, of which 18.3% had children under the age of 18 living with them, 45.1% were married couples living together, 2.8% had a female householder with no husband present, 2.8% had a male householder with no wife present, and 49.3% were non-families. 45.1% of all households were made up of individuals, and 26.7% had someone living alone who was 65 years of age or older. The average household size was 1.93 and the average family size was 2.72.

The median age in the city was 51.6 years. 16.8% of residents were under the age of 18; 7.4% were between the ages of 18 and 24; 11.6% were from 25 to 44; 43.7% were from 45 to 64; and 20.4% were 65 years of age or older. The gender makeup of the city was 43.1% male and 56.9% female.

2000 census
As of the census of 2000, there were 173 people, 80 households, and 44 families residing in the city. The racial makeup of the city was 95.95% White, 1.16% Asian, 0.58% Pacific Islander, and 2.31% from two or more races. Hispanic or Latino of any race were 2.31% of the population.

There were 80 households, out of which 18.8% had children under the age of 18 living with them, 47.5% were married couples living together, 5.0% had a female householder with no husband present, and 45.0% were non-families. 38.8% of all households were made up of individuals, and 21.3% had someone living alone who was 65 years of age or older. The average household size was 2.16 and the average family size was 3.00.

In the city, the population was spread out, with 21.4% under the age of 18, 4.6% from 18 to 24, 24.9% from 25 to 44, 24.9% from 45 to 64, and 24.3% who were 65 years of age or older. The median age was 44 years. For every 100 females, there were 78.4 males. For every 100 females age 18 and over, there were 86.3 males.

The median income for a household in the city was $25,625, and the median income for a family was $40,833. Males had a median income of $27,500 versus $19,500 for females. The per capita income for the city was $14,746. About 8.3% of families and 8.4% of the population were below the poverty line, including 13.5% of those under the age of eighteen and 13.2% of those 65 or over.

History
Iona was platted in 1878, and named after the Scottish island of Iona. A post office has been in operation at Iona since 1880.

Politics
Iona is located in Minnesota's 1st congressional district, represented by Mankato educator Tim Walz, a Democrat. At the state level, Iona is located in Senate District 22, represented by Republican Doug Magnus, and in House District 22A, represented by Republican Joe Schomacker.

References

External links
 Iona Community Guide

Cities in Minnesota
Cities in Murray County, Minnesota